Plasmodium watteni is a parasite of the genus Plasmodium subgenus Vinckeia. As in all Plasmodium species, P. watteni has both vertebrate and insect hosts. The vertebrate hosts for this parasite are mammals.

Taxonomy 
The parasite was first described by Lien and Cross in 1968.

Distribution 
This species is found in Taiwan.

Vectors
Not known.

Hosts 
The only known host of this species is the Formosan giant flying squirrel (Petaurista petaurista grandis).

References 

watteni